Parliamentary elections were held in Austria on 24 April 1927. The result was a victory for the Unity List (Einheitsliste), an alliance of the Christian Social Party and the Greater German People's Party, which won 85 of the 165 seats. However this brief coalition failed to result in any larger proportion of the votes than when the CSP ran alone, losing votes to the Landbund. 

Voter turnout was 89.3%.

Results

References

Austria
Legislative
Elections in Austria
Austria